Senator Jude may refer to:

Tad Jude (born 1951), Minnesota State Senate
Victor N. Jude (1923–1994), Minnesota State Senate